United Nations Security Council Resolution 2673 was passed by a unanimous vote on 11 January 2023, which extended the United Nations Verification Mission in Colombia and reaffirmed commitment to the Colombian peace process.

See also 

 List of United Nations Security Council Resolutions 2601 to 2700 (2021–present)

References

External links 

 Resolution

 2673
 2673
2023 in Colombia
 2673